The seventh season of House premiered on September 20, 2010, and ended on May 23, 2011. House and Cuddy attempt to make a real relationship work and face the question as to whether their new relationship will affect their ability to diagnose patients.  The new season features a new opening title sequence. This was the second change in the opening sequence since the show began; Jennifer Morrison's name was removed from the credits, while Peter Jacobson's and Olivia Wilde's were added to it, with new background images also inserted into the traditional title sequence. This is the last season to feature Lisa Edelstein, who did not return for the eighth season.

Prior to the start of the season, it was announced that a multi-episode arc that would feature House on the road was scrapped, forcing David Shore to return to the show to rework the rest of the season. Furthermore, Fox ordered one more episode for the season, bringing the total number of episodes to 23. The last episode of the season aired on May 23, 2011.

Cast and characters

Main cast
 Hugh Laurie as Dr. Gregory House
 Lisa Edelstein as Dr. Lisa Cuddy
 Omar Epps as Dr. Eric Foreman
 Robert Sean Leonard as Dr. James Wilson
 Jesse Spencer as Dr. Robert Chase
 Peter Jacobson as Dr. Chris Taub
 Olivia Wilde as Dr. Remy "Thirteen" Hadley
 Amber Tamblyn as Martha M. Masters

Recurring cast
 Jennifer Crystal Foley as Rachel Taub
 Candice Bergen as Arlene Cuddy
 Cynthia Watros as Sam Carr
 Tracy Vilar as Nurse Regina
Nigel Gibbs as Sanford Wells
 Paula Marshall as Julia Cuddy
Noelle Bellinghausen as Emily
 Brian Huskey as Dr. Riggin
 Karolina Wydra as Dominika Petrova
 Maurice Godin as Dr. Lawrence Hourani
 Zena Grey as Nurse Ruby
 Vernee Watson-Johnson as Nurse Smits
Ron Perkins as Dr. Ron Simpson

Guest stars
Keiko Agena, Shohreh Aghdashloo, Erika Alexander, Kendra Andrews, Logan Arens, Dylan Baker, Kuno Becker, Cleo Berry, Thom Bishops, J.R. Cacia, Erin Cahill,  Hayley Chase, Michael Chey, Gabrielle Christian, Justin Chon, Willis Chung, Austin Michael Coleman, Jack Coleman, David Costabile, Stephanie Courtney, Kevin Daniels, Michelle DeFraites, Brett DelBuono, Tiffany Espensen, Kayla Ewell, Chad Faust, Lesley Fera, Andrew Fiscella, Megan Follows, Ken Garito, Sprague Grayden, Joyce Greenleaf, Jennifer Grey, Matthew Haddad, Tina Holmes, Amy Irving, Brittany Ishibashi, Ashley Jones, Zachary Knighton, Amy Landecker, Jennifer Landon, Adrian LaTourelle, James Hiroyuki Liao, Matthew Lillard, Seidy Lopez, Donal Logue, Stella Maeve, Terry Maratos, Chris Marquette, Gerald McCullouch, Rachel Melvin, Brigdett Newman, Linda Park, Kimberlee Peterson, Kevin Phillips, Haley Pullos, Aaron Refvem, Allan Rich, Sasha Roiz, Tony Savas, Vinessa Shaw, Samantha Smith, Alyson Stoner, Tyler James Williams, Jarret Wright and George Wyner.

Episodes

References

General

Specific

Notes

Further reading

External links
 
 House recaps at televisionwithoutpity.com
 House episodes information at film.com
 List of House episodes at TVGuide.com
 

 
2010 American television seasons
2011 American television seasons